Matrjoschka ("Matryohka") is a film made and produced by the German artist Karin Hoerler in 2006. At ninety-five hours, it is one of the longest experimental films by time.

The film consists of images and sequences based on a single photo. It shows a boy riding a bicycle, a street, houses, garages, and sky. Over time, the image changes, but those movements are very slow and not directly visible.

The world premiere of the film was at the light spectacle Luminale 2006 in Frankfurt-Germany.  Matrjoschka was publicly shown on an outdoor 100 m2 LED-screen at the DrKW-building, starting on 23 April 2006 at 6:00am and ending on 28 April 2006 at 1:00am.  During the night, there was a break from 1:00 to 6:00am.

This film is available only in Windows Media Video format on DVD.

The movie is 4 days long and took over 10 years to make.

See also
List of longest films

External links

https://www.faz.net/s/RubFAE83B7DDEFD4F2882ED5B3C15AC43E2/Doc~EA23EA7576F9846BF8DFF4E668C177652~ATpl~Ecommon~Scontent.html
https://web.archive.org/web/20081012054601/http://light-building.messefrankfurt.com/frankfurt/de/fakten_bilder-detail.html?guid=mf_ddsp147_8178
https://web.archive.org/web/20081012054542/http://light-building.messefrankfurt.com/frankfurt/de/fakten_1744.html
http://container.zkm.de/pdf/NeuLuminale_Compass_2006.pdf
http://www.karin-hoerler.net/html/led-wand.html

2000s avant-garde and experimental films
2006 films
Films without speech
German avant-garde and experimental films
German independent films
2000s German films